Kizhakku Vaasal is an upcoming Indian Tamil-language television series produced by Raadhika Sarathkumar under the banner of Radaan Mediaworks. The show stars Raadhika Sarathkumar, S. A. Chandrasekhar, Reshma Muralidharan and Sanjeev Venkat. 

The concept of the show was originally based on Visu's 1986 film Samsaram Adhu Minsaram. It is scheduled for release on Star Vijay in the first half of 2023.

Synopsis
The show deal with the a mother struggling with her two daughters.

Cast
 Raadhika Sarathkumar
 S. A. Chandrasekhar
 Reshma Muralidharan
 Sanjeev Venkat
 Ashwini Radhakrishna
 Arun Kumar Rajan

Production

Development
On January end 2023, Raadhika Sarathkumar  confirmed through a press release that it would distribute new Tamil serial for Star Vijay, to be produced by Sarathkumar under Radaan Mediaworks, and also debuts as a television actor S. A. Chandrasekhar.

Casting
Raadhika Sarathkumar was cast in the female lead. Vijay's father and director Chandrasekhar plays an important role in the serial.

References

Star Vijay original programming
Tamil-language melodrama television series
2023 Tamil-language television series debuts
Tamil-language television shows
Television shows set in Tamil Nadu